Syahrul (30 August 1960 – 28 April 2020) was an Indonesian politician and teacher. He served as the Mayor of Tanjungpinang, and capital and second largest city in the Riau Islands, from 21 September 2018, until his death from COVID-19 on 28 April 2020. Prior to that office, Syahrul had served as Vice Mayor of Tanjungpinang from 2013 to 2018.

Biography

Early life and education
As a child, he sold ice and small cakes to earn extra money for his family. He graduated from Tanjungpinang Teacher Training School (SPG) in 1983 and was appointed a teacher. He later earned a bachelor of education degree from Indonesia Open University in 2008.

Career
Syahrul served as Vice Mayor of Tanjungpinang from 2013 to 2018 under Mayor Lis Darmansyah.

In 2018, Syahrul became Mayor of Tanjungpinang, while Rahma became the city's deputy mayor. They were inaugurated on 21 September 2018, at the Tanjungpinang  regional building for an expected term of 2018–2023.

Mayor Syahrul was hospitalized on 11 April 2020, for shortness of breath. A swab test confirmed that he was positive for COVID-19 during the COVID-19 pandemic in Indonesia  several days later. Syahrul's wife, his grandchild, and his doctor also tested positive for COVID-19. Syahrul remained hospitalized in the intensive care unit at Tanjungpinang Regional Hospital until his death on 28 April 2020, at the age of 59. Mayor Syahrul was the second Indonesian regional leader to die due to COVID-19 in April 2020, following the death of North Morowali Regent Aptripel Tumimomor on 2 April.

References

1960 births
2020 deaths
Mayors and regents of places in the Riau Islands
Great Indonesia Movement Party politicians
People from the Riau Islands
Mayors of places in Indonesia
Deaths from the COVID-19 pandemic in Indonesia